Lophocampa seruba is a moth of the family Erebidae. It is found in Brazil.

Subspecies
Lophocampa seruba seruba (Brazil)
Lophocampa seruba parva (Rothschild, 1909) (Brazil)

References

Moths described in 1855
seruba
Arctiinae of South America